The Church of St Mary the Virgin is a Church of England parish church in Godmanchester, Cambridgeshire. The church is a grade I listed building with its earliest phase dating to the 13th century. Most of the structure is of 13th- to 15th-century date but the tower was built in 1623. The stalls with misericords date from the late 15th century.

The parish of Godmanchester is part of the Diocese of Ely.

The Parish Church of St Mary the Virgin, Godmanchester: A History, Friends of St Mary’s Godmanchester, 2019 was published by Dr Ken Sneath.

References

External links

 Church website

Grade I listed churches in Cambridgeshire
13th-century church buildings in England
Church of England church buildings in Cambridgeshire
Godmanchester